is a Japanese slice of life medical comedy seinen manga series written and illustrated by Ryō Koshino. It's published since 2011 by Kodansha in Shūkan Gendai magazine. The last chapter will be published on March 2, 2015. The chapters have so far been compiled into 13 volumes. A Japanese television drama series adaptation was broadcast in 2013.

Cast
Daisuke Maki as Dr. Jumbo
Shiori Kutsuna as Hichō
Yō Yoshida
Yuko Fueki
Toshinori Omi

Volumes
1 (October 21, 2011)
2 (January 23, 2012)
3 (April 23, 2012)
4 (July 23, 2012)
5 (October 23, 2012)
6 (February 22, 2013)
7 (May 23, 2013)
8 (September 20, 2013)
9 (December 20, 2013)
10 (March 20, 2014)
11 (June 23, 2014)
12 (September 22, 2014)
13 (December 22, 2014)
14 (March 23, 2015)

References

External links
Official drama website 

2011 manga
2013 Japanese television series debuts
2013 Japanese television series endings
Comedy anime and manga
Kodansha manga
Nippon TV original programming
Seinen manga
Slice of life anime and manga
Yomiuri Telecasting Corporation original programming